
UN English Day is observed annually on 23 April. 
The event was established by UN's Department of Public Information in 2010 "to celebrate multilingualism and cultural diversity as well as to promote equal use of all six official languages throughout the Organization".

For the English Language Day, April 23 was chosen because it is the date "traditionally observed as both the birthday and date of death of William Shakespeare". 
Other dates were selected for the celebration of the UN's other five official languages.

See also 
 International Mother Language Day
 International observance
 Official languages of the United Nations
 UN Arabic Language Day
 UN Chinese Language Day
 UN French Language Day
 UN Portuguese Language Day
 UN Russian Language Day
 UN Spanish Language Day
 UN Swahili Language Day
 World Book Day

References

External links 
 UN English Language Day Official Site
 UN marks English Day as part of celebration of its six official languages, United Nations News Centre, 23 April 2010

April observances
English
English language